San Antonio de Carlos, established in 1567, was the first Jesuit mission in the New World. The site is located in what is now Mound Key Archaeological State Park off Estero Bay in Florida and what was the cultural center of the Calusa or Calos people, who lived in the area for more than 2,000 years.

Background
In the 1500s, the Spanish began exploring the Florida peninsula and the Caribbean. Juan Ponce de León, who came to the area in 1513, was the first contact between the Calusa and Europeans. He was injured when he was shot by an arrow in the thigh by a Calusa warrior, and died as the result of the injury.

King Caalus, also known as Carlos, ruled more than 20,000 Calusas people of southern Florida in the mid 1500s. He had a large house that held up to 2,000 people on Mound Key, an island created from disposed clam and oyster shells. The Calusa people, who lived in a number of villages, primarily ate shellfish, turtles, and fish for their sustenance. They supplemented their diet with food they gathered and hunted, including birds and deer.

History
Pedro Menéndez de Avilés, was appointed as Spain's first Governor of Florida in 1566. Menéndez arrived to the area with 200 soldiers, some of whom were musicians who played fifes, trumpets, and drums. They built a fort, which included a Jesuit mission. Many of the native Calusa people died as the result of diseases brought to them by the Spanish and for which they had no immunity. The Spanish abandoned the site by 1569, due to the resistance of the Calusa against colonization.

Aftermath

In 1697, Franciscan friars attempted to convert the Calusa people. The friars' naked and dead bodies were later found inside their canoes in the Florida Keys. Most of the Calusa people died off as the result of disease and warfare from armed local tribes around 1750. Any remaining people went to Cuba or the Florida Keys by the end of the 18th century. Fisherman and pirates occupied the site until the late 19th century. In 1891, the land was homesteaded by Frank Johnson. In 1905, the Johnson's land, and that of others who moved into the area, was sold to the utopian group, the Koreshans; and specficially, the Koreshan Unity, which was led by Cyrus Teed, who went by the name "Koresh". After Teed's death in 1908, the numbers of Koreshans dwindled, and the last remaining follower, Hedwig Michel, deeded the property to the State of Florida in 1961, upon which it became the Koreshan State Historic Site.

Archaeological study
The Spanish fort and mission of San Antón de Carlos, at the capital of the Calusa, are part of the Mound Key (8LL2) archaeological study. The paper, published in 2018, reports on the evidence of the fortification and structures of the colonial period.

References

Calusa
Native American history of Florida
Archaeological sites in Florida
Protected areas established in 1970
Florida Native American Heritage Trail
Pre-statehood history of Florida